The Annie Award for Character Design in an Animated Television/Broadcast Production is an Annie Award given annually to the best character animation in television or broadcast productions. It was first presented at the 30th Annie Awards.

Winners and nominees

2000s

2010s

2020s

Notes

References

External links 
 Annie Awards: Legacy

Annie Awards